Bellande is a surname. Notable people with the surname include:

Edward Antoine Bellande (1897–1976), American aviation and aeronautics pioneer
Jean-Robert Bellande (born 1970), American poker player, reality TV contestant, nightclub owner, and promoter